The 1987 Copa del Rey was the 51st edition of the Spanish basketball Cup. It was organized by the ACB and its Final Eight was played in Santa Cruz de Tenerife, in the Palacio Municipal de Deportes between 13 and 15 December 1986.

This edition was played by the four first qualified of the 1986–87 ACB first stage, and was the first one played with a Final Eight format.

Qualified teams

Group Odd

|}

Group Even

|}

Bracket

Final

References

External links
Boxscores at ACB.com
Linguasport

Copa del Rey de Baloncesto
Copa